The 1984 season was São Paulo's 55th season since club's existence.

Scorers

Overall
{|class="wikitable"
|-
|Games played || 68 (14 Campeonato Brasileiro, 38 Campeonato Paulista, 16 Friendly match)
|-
|Games won || 30 (6 Campeonato Brasileiro, 19 Campeonato Paulista, 5 Friendly match)
|-
|Games drawn || 25 (6 Campeonato Brasileiro, 13 Campeonato Paulista, 6 Friendly match)
|-
|Games lost || 13 (2 Campeonato Brasileiro, 6 Campeonato Paulista, 5 Friendly match)
|-
|Goals scored || 94
|-
|Goals conceded ||  54
|-
|Goal difference || +40
|-
|Best result || 7–1 (A) v Londrina - Friendly match - 1984.05.26
|-
|Worst result || 1–3 (A) v Marília - Campeonato Paulista - 1984.09.191–3 (A) v Ferroviária - Campeonato Paulista - 1984.10.20
|-
|Top scorer || Careca (14)
|-

Friendlies

Torneio Heleno Nunes

Official competitions

Campeonato Brasileiro

Record

Campeonato Paulista

Record

External links
official website 

Association football clubs 1984 season
1984
1984 in Brazilian football